The 1996 Paris Saint-Germain Rugby League season was the club's first season in the Super League. Coached by Michel Mazaré and assisted by David Ellis & John Kear, Paris competed in Super League I and finished in 11th place.

Table

Squad
Statistics include appearances and points in the Super League.

References

External links
Paris St Germain - Rugby League Project

Paris Saint-Germain Rugby League
Paris Saint-Germain Rugby League
French rugby league club seasons